Kasganj Junction railway station is a main railway station in Kasganj district, Uttar Pradesh. Its code is KSJ. It serves Kasganj city. The station consists of five platforms.[1]

References

Railway stations in Kasganj district
Izzatnagar railway division
Railway junction stations in Uttar Pradesh
Kasganj